The second season of El hotel de los famosos  is a reality show on eltrece, in which celebrities undergo a four-month confinement in a hotel without access to the outside.

Hosts and managers 
 Hosts
 Pampita and Leandro Leunis present the galas where the challenges that the participants must face and the eliminations, among other things, will be known.
 Locho Loccisano is the digital host in charge of the program's social networks.
 Managers
 Gabriel Oliveri, hotel manager
 José María Muscari, emotional coach
 Juan Miceli, in charge of the gardens
 Christian Petersen, kitchen manager

Format  
The rules and the format of the game remain the same as El hotel de los famosos (season 1)

New/changed rules
 Each week there will be a "super guest" who will be chosen by the Manager on Duty, giving the Guest their own room with a private bathroom, access to the minibar at any time, a prominent robe, and can also get up at any time. Said Super Guest must choose a member of the staff to take care of their requests for 24 hours.
 The winner of the guest challenge, in addition to winning the suit, will obtain immunity for all against all.
 The Legacy: every time a person is eliminated, that is, when they lose the Duel in H, they must leave a secret vote against a partner that will be revealed in the "All against All"

Participants 
A total of 16 participants entered the Hotel in episode 1.

In episode 6, Mimi re-enters the hotel by decision of the guest leader (Martin), to become Abigail's replacement.

In episode 11, Florencia enters the game to take over from Charlotte. 

In episode 16, Yasmin entered the Hotel to take the place left by Erica's departure.

Weekly accommodation 
 C: Captian
 ♦ - Best  Staff
 𝄫 - Worst Staff

Nominations table 
 Bold - Indicates that the vote corresponds to "Face to Face"
 Italic  - Indicates that the vote corresponds to "All against all"
  - Indicates that the vote is a "Legacy vote" and is positive, that is, 1 point is subtracted from the nominations.
  - Indicates that the vote is positive to save
  - Indicates that the vote is negative to eliminate.

Notes

Summary statistics

Visits 
 Alex Caniggia
 Fer Vázquez
 Marcela Tinayre
 Iliana Calabro
 Pachu Peña
 Anamá Ferreyra
 El Polaco

References 

2020s reality television series